Louise-Marie or Louise Marie may refer to:

People

 Louise Marie de la Grange d'Arquien (1634-1728), daughter of Henri de la Grange d'Arquien and Françoise de La Châtre
 Louise Marie of the Palatinate (1647-1679), daughter of Edward, Count Palatine of Simmern and Anne Gonzaga
 Louise Marie-Thérèse (1658–1730), also known as "The Black Nun of Moret", French nun and supposed daughter of Maria Theresa of Spain
 Louise Marie Anne de Bourbon (1674–1681), illegitimate daughter of Louis XIV of France
 Princess Louisa Maria Teresa Stuart, (1682-1712), known in French as Louise Marie
 Louise Marie Madeleine Fontaine (1706–1799), French saloniste
 Louise Marie d'Orléans (1726-1728), infant French Princess
 Princess Louise Marie of France (1737-1787), Carmelite nun
 Louise Marie Thérèse Bathilde, daughter of Louis Philippe I, Duke of Orléans, wife of Louis Henri, Prince of Condé
 Louise Marie Adélaïde de Bourbon (1753-1821), daughter and heiress of Louis Jean Marie de Bourbon, duc de Penthièvre
 Louise Marie Adélaïde Eugènie d'Orléans (1777-1847), daughter of Louis Philip II, Duke of Orléans
 Louise Marie-Jeanne Hersent-Mauduit (1784–1862), French painter
 Louise-Marie d'Orléans (1812-1850), French princess, Queen of the Belgians, second wife of King Leopold I of Belgium
 Princess Louise Marie d'Artois (1819–1864), daughter of Charles Ferdinand, Duke of Berry, wife of Charles III, Duke of Parma
 Princess Louise Marie of Belgium (1858-1924), eldest daughter of King Leopold II of Belgium and Marie Henriette of Austria

Other
 Belgian frigate Louise-Marie (F931)
 Louise-Marie, Belgian hamlet

See also
 Marie Louise (disambiguation)

Compound given names
French feminine given names